Kemenuh is a village on the Indonesian island of Bali in the town of Sukawati, Gianyar Regency.

Nature 
The Kemenuh Butterfly Park and Tegenungan Waterfall is located in Kemenuh.

References 

Gianyar Regency